The 1971 Intercontinental Cup was an association football tie held over two legs in December 1971 between the runners-up of the 1970–71 European Cup, Panathinaikos, replacing European Cup winners Ajax which declined to participate, and Nacional, winners of the 1971 Copa Libertadores.

The first leg was held on 15 December 1971 at the Karaiskakis Stadium, home of Olympiacos, as Panathinaikos ground was deemed unsuitable. The match finished up as a 1–1 draw. The goals came from Totis Filakouris in the 48th minute and Luis Artime in the 50th minute. Julio Morales broke the leg of Yiannis Tomaras and was sent off. Estadio Centenario hosted the return leg 13 days later on 28 December 1971. In the second leg, Nacional beat Panathinaikos 2–1, therefore the Uruguayan club won the series 3–2 on aggregate to achieve their first Intercontinental Cup trophy. Argentine striker Luis Artime was the keyplayer of the series after scoring three goals on both matches.

Qualified teams

Venues

Match details

First leg 

|valign="top" width="50%"|

|}

Second leg 

|valign="top" width="50%"|

|}

See also
1970–71 European Cup
1971 Copa Libertadores
Panathinaikos F.C. in European football

References

 

Intercontinental Cup
Intercontinental Cup
Intercontinental Cup
Intercontinental Cup (football)
Intercontinental Cup 1971
Intercontinental Cup 1971
International club association football competitions hosted by Uruguay
International club association football competitions hosted by Greece
inter
December 1971 sports events in Europe
Sport in Piraeus
Sports competitions in Montevideo
1970s in Montevideo
December 1971 sports events in South America